Fulk le Strange, 1st Baron Strange of Blackmere (died 23 January 1324) was a 13th- and 14th-century English nobleman.

He was a younger son of Robert le Strange. After the death of his older brother John, Fulk inherited in 1289 lands in Wrockwardine, Ellesmere and the other possessions of his family in Shropshire. In 1294 he took part in the campaign in Gascony. From 1298 he took part during the Scottish Wars of Independence in several campaigns during the reigns of kings Edward I and Edward II. Through writ of summons he attended parliament in 1308 and 1309 as Baron Strange of Blackmere. He was appointed on 26 May 1322 as Seneschal of Gascony. He died in January 1324 and was succeeded by his son John.

Fulk married Eleonore, daughter of John Giffard, 1st Baron Giffard and his wife Maud de Clifford, and had the following known issue:
Fulk
John
Elizabeth, married Robert Corbet

References 
 Cracrofts Peerage: Strange of Blackmere, Baron (E, 1309 - abeyant 1777

13th-century births
Year of birth unknown
1324 deaths
13th-century English nobility
14th-century English nobility
Medieval English knights
Seneschals of Gascony
Le Strange family
Barons Strange of Blackmere
English people of the Wars of Scottish Independence